The International Journal of Developmental Biology is a peer-reviewed open access scientific journal covering research in developmental biology. The current editor-in-chief is Juan Arechaga (University of the Basque Country). It was established in 1953 as Anales del desarrollo and obtained its current name in 1989.

Abstracting and indexing 
The journal is abstracted and indexed in MEDLINE/PubMed. According to the Journal Citation Reports, the journal has a 2014 impact factor of 1.903, ranking it 35th out of 41 journals in the category "Developmental Biology".

References

External links 

Publications established in 1989
English-language journals
University of the Basque Country
Monthly journals
Developmental biology journals